Friendly Hills, also known as Margaret Culkin Banning House, is a historic estate located near Tryon, Polk County, North Carolina.  The house was built in 1924, and is a large, two-story, Tudor Revival style dwelling with stuccoed exterior walls decorated with hewn, half timbering.  Also on the property are the contributing swimming pool (c. 1920s-1930s), log cabin used as a writing retreat by author Margaret Culkin Banning (1891-1982) (c. 1920s-1930s), and fish pool (1920s).  Ms. Banning purchased Friendly Hills in 1936 and enjoyed the property seasonally for the remainder of her life.

It was added to the National Register of Historic Places in 1998.

References

Houses on the National Register of Historic Places in North Carolina
Tudor Revival architecture in North Carolina
Houses completed in 1924
Houses in Polk County, North Carolina
National Register of Historic Places in Polk County, North Carolina